The Massa Fermana Altarpiece is a 1468 tempera and gold on panel by Carlo Crivelli, held in Santi Lorenzo e Silvestro church in the town of Massa Fermana. It is signed "KAROLVS CRIVELLVS VENETVS PINXIT HOC OPVS MCCCCLXVIII". It is his earliest known surviving work and is notable for dating his return to Italy.

The central register is a Madonna and Child flanked by Saints John the Baptist, Lawrence, Sylvester and Francis. Above this are panels of Mary at the Annunciation, the Pietà and Gabriel at the Annunciation, whilst below is a predella showing Christ at Gethsemane, the Crucifixion, the Flagellation and the Resurrection.

History
Amico Ricci (1834) quotes a local traditions that the work was commission by a count of the Azzolini family from Fermo, who were also lords of Massa Fermana.

References

Paintings by Carlo Crivelli
Paintings depicting John the Baptist
Paintings of Francis of Assisi
Paintings of Saint Lawrence
Paintings of the Pietà
Paintings depicting the Annunciation
Paintings of the Flagellation of Jesus
Paintings of the Resurrection of Christ
Paintings depicting Christ in the Garden of Gethsemane
Paintings depicting the Crucifixion of Jesus
1468 paintings